Svetlana Valeriyevna Tkacheva (born 3 November 1984) is a Russian female ice hockey player. She was part of the Russia women's national ice hockey team that participated in the 2010 Winter Olympics. Russia finished 6th.

References

1984 births
Living people
Ice hockey players at the 2010 Winter Olympics
Ice hockey players at the 2014 Winter Olympics
Ice hockey players at the 2018 Winter Olympics
Olympic ice hockey players of Russia
Ice hockey people from Moscow
Russian women's ice hockey defencemen
HC Tornado players